The Rumbling Hearts animated television series is based on the visual novel by the Japanese software company âge. The episodes, produced by animation studio Studio Fantasia, are directed by Tetsuya Watanabe, with character designs by Yoko Kikuchi. The story follows the main character Takayuki Narumi, and his relationships with his schoolmates Haruka Suzumiya and Mitsuki Hayase.

Fourteen episodes were produced for the Rumbling Hearts series, broadcast between October 2003 and January 2004. They were released by Media Factory in Japan as a set of seven DVD collections between February and August 2004, with each DVD containing two episodes. The series was later released as a DVD box set in December 2007, and as a Blu-ray box-set in February 2012. Funimation licensed, localized and distributed the series in three volumes with an English dub, released between December 2006 and March 2007. A complete box set was released in August 2007, while a complete series collection was released in August 2008.

An OVA series titled Kimi ga Nozomu Eien ~Next Season~, produced by Brain's Base and directed by Hideki Takayama, was released in four editions between December 2007 and December 2008, featuring most of the same cast but following an alternate retelling to the series.

Rumbling Hearts
The first series, consisting of fourteen episodes and produced by Studio Fantasia aired between October 5, 2003 and January 4, 2004 on Chiba TV and a number of other stations. They were released by Media Factory in Japan as a set of seven DVD collections between February and August 2004, with each DVD containing two episodes. A complete box set was released in August 2007, while a complete series collection was released in August 2008.

Funimation licensed, localized and distributed the series in three volumes with an English dub, released between December 2006 and March 2007. A complete box set was released in August 2007, while a complete series collection was released in August 2008.

The anime has two main theme songs, the opening theme "Precious Memories", and the ending theme , which are both sung by Haruka's voice actress Minami Kuribayashi. Two additional songs by Kuribayashi were used, "Rumbling Hearts", used as the ending theme of episode 2, and "Nemuri Hime", which was used as an insert song. The ending theme for episode 14 is "Kimi ga Nozomu Eien" by MEGUMI.

Kimi ga Nozomu Eien ~Next Season~
A four-episode OVA titled Kimi ga Nozomu Eien ~Next Season~ was announced on August 25, 2006. The original video animation follows Haruka's route, in contrast to the TV series' modified version of Mitsuki's ending. The OVA, produced by the Japanese animation studio Brain's Base and distributed by Bandai Visual was released between December 21, 2007 and December 19, 2008 .  The special editions contain a bonus CD soundtrack with each DVD and a different cover artwork. The OVA's first ending theme is "Next Season" while its second ending theme is "Eternity", which also serves as the opening theme of the first and second OVAs. Both songs are sung by Minami Kuribayashi.

Ayumayu Gekijou
A comedy ONA titled Ayumayu Gekijou that was broadcast from September to December 2006 on Kiminozo Radio's homepage with four episodes, and the remaining three episodes were included in the DVD, which was released in February 2007. The main characters are SD versions of Ayu and Mayu and various other characters from Kimi ga Nozomu Eien and Muv-Luv. The series contains many references to Muv-Luv (for example, in the second episode, Ayu uses an S-11 SDS and Haruka is turned into a 00 Unit) and the fourth episode is little more than a parody of Muv-Luv Alternative. The series' main theme is
 by UYAMUYA, while the song "Carry On" by Masaaki Endou is used as an insert song.

References

Rumbling hearts